Rosenska Pokalen 1899, part of the 1899 Swedish football season, was the first Rosenska Pokalen tournament played. Three teams participated and two matches were played, both on 24 September 1899. Gefle IF won the tournament ahead of runners-up AIK.

Participating clubs

Tournament results 
Semi-final

Final

References 

Print

1899
1899 in Swedish football